The Book of Numbers is the fourth book in the Hebrew Torah and the Christian Bible.

Book of Numbers may also refer to:

 Book of Numbers (film), 1973 film
 Book of Numbers (novel), 2015 novel by Joshua Cohen
 A Book of Numbers, 1982 book by John Grant

See also
 Numbers (disambiguation)